Aleksandr Sergeyevich Kozlov (19 March 1993 – 15 July 2022) was a Russian professional footballer who played as a midfielder or striker.

Career
Kozlov made his debut in the Russian Premier League on 25 April 2010 for FC Spartak Moscow.

On 16 January 2017, Kozlov signed a one-year contract with Kazakhstan Premier League side FC Okzhetpes.

On 26 June 2019, Ararat Yerevan announced the signing of Kozlov along with another twelve players.

Death
On 15 July 2022, Spartak Moscow announced the death of Kozlov, reportedly as a result of a blood clot suffered during training with Zorkiy Krasnogorsk.

Career statistics

References

External links
 
 
  Aleksandr Kozlov at Footballdatabase
  Career profile at sportbox.ru

1993 births
2022 deaths
Footballers from Moscow
Russian footballers
Association football midfielders
Russia youth international footballers
Russia under-21 international footballers
Russian Premier League players
Russian expatriate footballers
Expatriate footballers in Kazakhstan
Expatriate footballers in Armenia
FC Spartak Moscow players
FC Khimki players
FC Tosno players
FC Fakel Voronezh players
FC Okzhetpes players
FC Tyumen players
FC Ararat Yerevan players
FC Ararat Moscow players
FC Spartak-2 Moscow players